Dennis Engel (born 20 October 1995) is a German footballer who plays as a defender for  club VfB Oldenburg.

References

External links
 
 
 

Living people
1995 births
Sportspeople from Oldenburg
German footballers
Footballers from Lower Saxony
Association football defenders
Sportfreunde Lotte players
SSV Jeddeloh players
VfL Oldenburg players
SV Rödinghausen players
3. Liga players
Regionalliga players